Madar may refer to:

 Madar or Mother (1991 film), Iranian movie by Ali Hatami
 Mother, a 1951 Iranian film
 Madar, Yemen, village in Yemen.
 Madar tree, Erythrina variegata
 Madar, Nepal
 Madar (album) an album by Norwegian saxophonist Jan Garbarek and Tunisian oud player Anouar Brahem
 Badiuddin Shah Madar, Muslim Sufi saint who founded the Madari sect of Sufism in India
 Yam Madar (born 2000), Israeli professional basketball player
 Madar, Hungarian name for Modrany, village in southern Slovakia